The Ashton is a 36-story residential skyscraper located in Austin, Texas. The tower rises just 15 feet from its shorter neighbor to the east, 100 Congress. The Ashton was one of the first skyscrapers built in Austin during the city's 2006-2010 skyscraper boom. The building is notable for its extensive pool deck located atop the podium. The Ashton is the twin of a building of the same name in Dallas, Texas, though the Austin property is 16 stories taller.

See also

List of tallest buildings in Austin

References

Residential skyscrapers in Austin, Texas
Residential buildings completed in 2009
HKS, Inc. buildings